The Women's 5000m athletic event for the 2012 Summer Paralympics took place at the London Olympic Stadium on 2 September 2012. The event, open to T53 and T54 wheelchair athletes, consisted of 2 heats and a final.

Results
The event was won by Swiss athlete Edith Wolf, beating American Shirley Reilly, who won the silver medal, and Australian Christie Dawes, who claimed the bronze medal.

Records
Prior to the competition, the existing World and Paralympic records were as follows:

Results

Round 1
Competed 31 August 2012 from 10:15. Qual. rule: first 3 in each heat (Q) plus the 4 fastest other times (q) qualified.

Heat 1

Heat 2

Final
Competed 2 September 2012 at 10:37.

 
Q = qualified by place. q = qualified by time. DNF = Did not finish.

References

Athletics at the 2012 Summer Paralympics
2012 in women's athletics